The No 6 is a British minimum metal anti-personnel mine. The mine is a long thin cylinder with a tapered bottom and a three pronged trigger on the top. A metal safety clip prevents the mine being triggered before it is armed. A detector ring can be fitted around the middle of the mine. Sufficient pressure on the prongs will break a sheer ring, and release the striker, triggering the mine.

The mine is now obsolete, and has been withdrawn from UK service and all stockpiles have been destroyed.

Specifications
 Diameter: 40 mm
 Height: 190 mm
 Weight: 227 g
 Explosive content: 141 g of TNT
 Operating pressure: 22 kg

References
 Jane's Mines and Mine Clearance 2005-2006
 Brassey's Essential Guide To Anti-Personnel Landmines, Eddie Banks

Anti-personnel mines
Land mines of the United Kingdom